This is a list of Cruzeiro players both past and present. Clubs are as of 8 March 2009.

A
 Alex Mineiro
 Alex Alves
 Alex – Currently at  Coritiba F.C
 Aldo – Currently at  Grêmio reserves
 Andre Doring
 André Luis – Currently playing at  Fluminense
 Araújo – Currently playing at  Fluminense
 Víctor Aristizábal

B
 Belletti – Currently at  Fluminense F.C.
 Brito

C
 Carlinhos Bala – Currently at  Fortaleza
 Cris – Currently at  Galatasaray

D
 Deivid – Currently at  Clube de Regatas do Flamengo
 Dida
 Diogo
 Dirceu Lopes
 Diego – Currently at  Gremio
 Dudu – Currently at  Cruzeiro

E
 Edilson
 Edu Dracena – Currently at  Santos FC
 Edu Lima
 Élber
 Eliezio
 Élson – Currently at  FC Rostov

F
 Fábio – Currently at  Cruzeiro
 Fábio Pinto – Currently at  America Mineiro
 Fábio Santos
 Fred – Currently at  Fluminense
  Freddy Rincón
 Felipe Gomes

G
 Gabriel – Currently at  Gremio
 Guilherme Milhomem Gusmão – Currently at  Atletico Mineiro
 Gilberto – Currently at  Cruzeiro
 Geovanni – Currently at  Vitoria
 Giovanny Espinoza -Currently at  Unión Española
 Gladstone – Currently at  Vaslui
 Gomes – Currently at  Watford F.C
 Gabriel – Currently at  AC Milan

H
 Heraldo Becerra Nuñez

I

J
 Jairzinho
 Joãozinho
 Jonathan – Currently at  Internazionale
 Jonathas – Currently at  Brescia
 Jonilson – Currently at  Goiás on loan from  Botafogo
 Júlio César – Currently at  Fluminense
 Juan Pablo Sorín

K
 Kerlon – Currently at  Nacional (NS) on loan from  Internazionale

L
 Lauro – Currently at  Internacional
 Leandro – Currently at  Atlético Mineiro on loan from  F.C. Porto
 Leandro Bonfim – Currently at  Desportivo Brasil
 Léo Silva – Currently at  Americana Futebol
 Luisão – Currently at  S.L. Benfica
 Luizão – Currently at  FC Bunyodkor
 Lucas Silva Borges – Currently at  Real Madrid

M
 Cláudio Maldonado – Currently at  Corinthians
 Martinez – Currently at  Cerezo Osaka
 Marcelo Martins – Currently at  Shakhtar Donetsk
 Maxwell – Currently at  PSG
 Michel
 Müller

N
 Nelinho
 Niginho

O

P

 Perfumo
 Pablo Forlán
 Palhinha(1970s player)
Palhinha (1990s player)

Q

R
 Raul
 Revétria
 Rivaldo – Currently at  São Paulo FC
 Roberto Batata
 Roberto Palacios – Currently at  Sporting Cristal
 Rodrigão
 Ronaldo
 Ramires – Currently at  Jiangsu Suning

S
 Sandro – Currently at  Americana Futebol
 Sergio Manoel – Currently at  Bragantino
 Shamir Patel

T
 Tapia
 Teco – Currently at  Brasiliense
 Thiago Heleno – Currently at  Palmeiras
 Toninho Almeida
 Toninho Cerezo
 Tostão

U
 Ulises de la Cruz – Currently at  LDU Quito

V
 Alexander Viveros – Currently at  Talleres de Córdoba
 Victor Quintana

W
 Wagner – Currently at  Fluminense
 Walax
 Wilson Piazza
 Wilson Gottardo

X

Y

Z
 Zé Eduardo 

 
Cruzeiro Esporte Clube players
Association football player non-biographical articles